Ruth Buckstein (born 28 July 1955) is an Australian former cricketer who played as a right-handed batter. She appeared in one Test match and 16 One Day Internationals for Australia between 1986 and 1988. She played domestic cricket for Victoria.

Early life 
Buckstein played softball for the Victorian state team before her first club cricket match appearance in 1973. At the time, Buckstein was an undergraduate student at Monash University.

Cricket career 
A right-handed batter, Buckstein played one Test match and 16 WODIs, including scoring two WODI centuries. Her final WODI appearance was in the final of the 1988 Women's Cricket World Cup, which was won by Australia.
 
Buckstein played as an opener.  Buckstein and Julien Wiener are the only Jewish Australians to have represented Australia in Test cricket.

One Day International centuries

References

External links
 
 
 Ruth Buckstein at southernstars.org.au

1955 births
Living people
Cricketers from Melbourne
Australia women Test cricketers
Australia women One Day International cricketers
Victoria women cricketers